Pedro Casique Fernández (born 22 March 2001) is a Peruvian footballer who plays as a winger for Peruvian Segunda División side Deportivo Llacuabamba.

Career

Club career
Casique is a product of Unión Comercio and made his first team debut on 14 April 2019 against FBC Melgar. He started on the bench but replaced David Dioses in the finale minutes. Casique had a good season and although his young age, he was notices for 15 league appearances.

On 6 March 2020 it was confirmed, that 18-year old Casique had joined Ayacucho FC on a deal for 2020.

Ahead of the 2022 season, Casique signed with Los Chankas. In January 2023, he moved to fellow league club Deportivo Llacuabamba.

References

External links
 

Living people
2001 births
Association football wingers
Peruvian footballers
Peruvian Primera División players
Unión Comercio footballers
Ayacucho FC footballers